The 1991–1992 international cricket season was from September 1991 to April 1992.

Season overview

October

1991–92 Wills Trophy

November

South Africa in India

West Indies in Pakistan

India in Australia

December

1991-92 Benson & Hedges World Series

Sri Lanka in Pakistan

January

England in New Zealand

February

1992 Benson & Hedges World Cup

April

South Africa in the West Indies

References

1991 in cricket
1992 in cricket